Subbaramiah Minakshisundaram (12 October 1913, Trichur –
13 August 1968, Kerala) was an Indian mathematician who worked on heat kernels and parabolic partial differential equations and introduced the Minakshisundaram–Pleijel zeta function.

Publications

References

External links
 S. Minakshisundaram memorial society

1913 births
1968 deaths
20th-century Indian mathematicians
Scientists from Kerala